Rhamat Alhassan (born September 7, 1996) is a volleyball player who played collegiately for Florida.

Early life
Alhassan grew up in Glenarden, Maryland. She started playing basketball in seventh grade, and did not play volleyball until her sophomore year in high school, at The Academy of the Holy Cross in Kensington, Maryland.

College 
Many schools were interested in her as an athlete, but most were interested in her basketball skills, which were more advanced than her volleyball skills. Her former basketball coach, Eddie Simpson, says she "is a better basketball player than she is a volleyball player", and Alhassan agrees. Florida was one of many schools interested in her as a volleyball player. While in high school, Alhassan considered the possibility of playing both sports in college, but ended up concentrating on volleyball. Alhassan chose Florida, partly for the volleyball, partly for the location, and partly for Florida's College of Journalism and Communications.

In her last season at Florida, Alhassan helped lead the Gators to the 2017 National Championships. The Gators haven't been to the Final 4 since 2003.

In 2018, Alhassan won the Honda Sports Award as the nation's best female volleyball player.

Professional career 
After graduation from the University of Florida, Alhassan continued to play volleyball professionally.

Honors, and awards 

 Honda Sports Award for Volleyball (2018)
American Volleyball Coaches Association (AVCA) All-American
2017 SEC Volleyball Player of the year
 Second Gator in history (Kelly Murphy) to earn a spot on one of the three AVCA All-America teams four times
 Four-time AVCA All-American (2014—Second Team; 2015, 2017—First Team; 2016—Third Team)
 Four-time AVCA All-Southeast Region (2014–16)
 Four-time All-SEC (2014–16)
 Second player in Division I history to tally at least 1,250 kills, 605 blocks and a .420 clip
 Career .423 hitting percentage ranked tied for 7th in Division I history following 2017 season
 UF record holder in career total blocks (674) and block assists (584)
 2017 USAV National Team—Pan American Cup -- Gold Medalist
 2016 USAV National Team—Pan American Cup -- Bronze Medalist / Best Blocker
 2015 USAV Junior National Team—European Global Challenge -- Gold Medalist
 2014 USAV Junior National Team—NORCECA Championships -- Gold Medalist / MVP / All-Star Team / Best Blocker
 2014 USAV Women's National Team Winter Training Block Roster
 2012 & 2013 USAV Youth National Training Team

References/Notes and references

Living people
Florida Gators women's volleyball players
People from Prince George's County, Maryland
1996 births
American expatriate sportspeople in Japan
American expatriate sportspeople in Italy
Expatriate volleyball players in Japan
Expatriate volleyball players in Italy
Serie A1 (women's volleyball) players